Hugh McMahon may refer to:

 Hugh McMahon (footballer)
 Hugh McMahon (politician)
 Hugh McMahon Memorial Novice Chase